Patrice is a given name meaning noble or patrician, related to the names Patrick and Patricia.

In English, Patrice is often a feminine first name. In French, it is used as a masculine first name.

Popularity
In the United States, the popularity of the name Patrice peaked in 1958 as the No. 212 most popular name. Its popularity has had ups and downs since then, but has fallen ever since 1987. The year 1995 was the most recent year the name Patrice appeared in the top 1000 names of babies born in the United States, at no. 941.

People

Men
Patrice Bart-Williams, known by the mononym "Patrice", reggae musician
Patrice Bergeron, ice hockey player
Patrice Brisebois, ice hockey player
Patrice Motsepe, South African businessman 
Patrice Coirault (18751959), French ethnomusicologist
Patrice Evra (born 1981), French footballer
Patrice Guers, French bassist, known for his work in Rhapsody of Fire
Patrice Laliberté, Canadian film and television director and screenwriter
Patrice Loko (born 1970), French footballer
Patrice Lumumba, first prime minister of the Democratic Republic of Congo
Patrice de MacMahon, duc de Magenta, former president of the French Republic
Patrice O'Neal, American stand-up comedian
Patrice-Edouard Ngaïssona, former minister of sports in the Central African Republic, president of the Central African Football Federation, leader of Anti-balaka and war criminal
Patrice Pastor (born 1973), Monegasque businessman
Patrice Talon, Benin's incumbent president
Patrice Wilson, Nigerian songwriter and producer behind ARK Music Factory

Women
Patrice Baldwin, British drama and theatre educator
Patrice Donnelly, American hurdler
Patrice Hollis, Playboy Playmate September 2007
Patrice Holloway, American soul and pop singer
Patrice Lee, American R&B Singer-Songwriter 
Patrice Martinez, American Actress
Patrice Pike, notable for her music career.                                                                                       
Patrice Roberts, Trinidadian Soca Singer
Patrice Rushen, American R&B singer-songwriter
Patrice Wymore, American film and television actress and widow of Errol Flynn

Fictional characters
Patrice in the 2001 film Baby Boy
Patrice, a secondary character in season 8 of the sitcom How I Met Your Mother
Patrice, a mother in Julie Anne Peters' books Luna and Define Normal 
Patrice, a mercenary in the 2012 James Bond film Skyfall
Patrice de Broglie, volcanologist in Anne McCaffrey's book Dragonsdawn
Patrice Dellaplane in 1988 film Action Jackson
Patrice Johnson in 1988 musical film Dance 'til Dawn
Patrice McDowell in 1988 film Coming To America

References

English feminine given names
French masculine given names

cs:Patricie
hu:Patrícia
pl:Patrycja
sk:Patrícia